The Commander Islands, Komandorski Islands, or Komandorskie Islands (Komandorskiye ostrova) are a series of treeless, sparsely populated Russian islands in the Bering Sea located about  east of the Kamchatka Peninsula in the Russian Far East. Administratively, they compose Aleutsky District of Kamchatka Krai in Russia.

Geography 

Between the two runs the International Date Line. The relief is somewhat diverse, encompassing folded-block mountains, volcanic plateaus, terraced plains and low mountains. The geologic origins are long-extinct volcanoes on the edge of the Pacific and North American Plates. It lies at similar latitudes to Glasgow and Edinburgh in Scotland, Southern Scandinavia and southern parts of the Alaskan Panhandle.

The climate is relatively mild and maritime, with frequent precipitation (220–240 days/year). The cool summers are notoriously foggy. The Köppen climate classification would be classed as Dfc bordering on Cfc and Dfb.

Population 

The only permanently inhabited locality is the village of Nikolskoye on the northwest end of Bering Island, with an estimated population of 613 . This consists almost entirely of Russians and Aleuts. The majority of the islands' area, as well as much of the adjacent marine habitat, is taken up by the Komandorsky Zapovednik, a natural preserve. The economy is based primarily on fishing, mushroom gathering, the administration of the zapovednik (i.e. strictly protected wilderness), ecotourism and government services.

The village has a school, a satellite tracking station and a dirt airstrip south of the village.

The other settlements on the two islands are small villages or scattering of houses:

 Severnoye
 Podutesnaya
 Gladkovskaya
 Lisennova
 Peschanka
 Preobrazhenskoye
 Glinka

Natural history 

There is no true forest on the Commander Islands. The vegetation is dominated by lichens, mosses and different associations of marshy plants with low grass and dwarf trees. Very tall umbellifers are also common.

Mammals
Due to the high productivity of the Bering Sea shelf and the Pacific slope and their remoteness from human influence, the Commander Islands are marked by a great abundance of marine animal life and a relative paucity of terrestrial organisms. Notably, significant numbers of northern fur seals (some 200,000 individuals) and Steller sea lions (approximately 5,000 individuals) summer there, both on reproductive rookeries and non-reproductive haul-outs. Sea otters, common seals and larga seals are likewise abundant. Indeed, the sea otter population is stable and possibly increasing, even as their population is falling precipitously in the rest of the Aleutian islands.

The neighboring waters provide important feeding, wintering and migrating habitat for many whale species, many of which are threatened or endangered. Among these are: sperm whales, orcas, several species of Minke whales, beaked whales, and porpoises, humpbacks and endangered species such as the North Pacific right whales and fin whales.

Bering Island was the only known habitat of Steller's sea cows, an immense (over 4000 kg) sirenian related to the dugong. The sea cow was hunted to extinction within 27 years of its discovery in 1741. 

The much less diverse terrestrial fauna includes two distinct, endemic subspecies of Arctic fox, (Alopex lagopus semenovi and A. l. beringensis). Though relatively healthy now, these populations had been significantly depleted in the past due to the fur trade. Most other terrestrial species, including wild reindeer, American mink and rats, have all been introduced to the islands by man.

Birds
Over a million seabirds gather to nest on numerous large colonies along almost all the coastal cliffs. The most common are northern fulmar; common, brunnich's and pigeon guillemots; horned and tufted puffins; cormorants; gulls; and kittiwakes including the extremely local red-legged kittiwake which nests in only a few other colonies in the world. Waterfowl and sandpipers are also abundant along the pre-lake depressions and river valleys of Bering Island, though largely absent from Medny Island. Migratory birds of note with critical nesting or feeding habitat on the islands include such species as Steller's eider, Pacific golden plover and Aleutian tern. Raptors of note include the rare Steller's sea eagle and gyrfalcon. Other bird types include auks such as the Ancient murrelet and game birds such as the Rock ptarmigan. In total, over 180 bird species have been registered on the Commander Islands. The spectacled cormorant, a large essentially flightless bird in the cormorant family, was driven to extinction by around 1850. The islands have been recognised as an Important Bird Area (IBA) by BirdLife International because they support populations of various threatened bird species, including many waterbirds and seabirds.

The fish fauna in the mountainous, fast running streams is composed primarily of migratory salmonids, including Arctic char, Dolly Varden, black spotted trout, chinook, sockeye, coho and pink salmon.

There are no amphibians or reptiles on the Commander Islands.

History 

The Commander Islands received their name from Commander Vitus Bering, whose ship St Peter wrecked on the otherwise uninhabited Bering Island on his return voyage from Alaska in 1741. Bering died on the island along with much of the crew. His grave is marked by a modest monument. About half of the crew did manage to survive the winter, thanks in part to the abundance of wildlife (notably the newly discovered Steller's sea cow) and the efforts of naturalist and physician Georg Wilhelm Steller, who cured many of the men of scurvy by compelling them to eat seaweed. Eventually, a smaller boat was built from the remains of the St. Peter and the survivors found their way back to Kamchatka, heavily laden with valuable sea otter pelts. The discovery of the sea otters sparked the great rush of fur-seeking "Promyshlenniky" which drove the Russian expansion into Alaska. Steller's sea cow, whose habitat was apparently restricted to the kelp-beds around Bering Island, was exterminated by 1768.

Aleut (Unangan) people were transferred to the Commander Islands early in 1825 by the Russian-American Company from the Aleutians for the seal trade. Most of the Aleuts inhabiting Bering Island came from Atka Island and those who lived on Medny Island came from Attu Island, now both American possessions. A mixed language called Mednyj Aleut, with Aleut roots but Russian verb inflection, developed among the inhabitants. Today the population of the islands is about ⅔ Russian and ⅓ Aleut.

See also 
Preobrazhenskoye, Kamchatka Oblast, a now-abandoned village on Medny Island.

Notes

References 
 Richard Ellis, Encyclopedia of the Sea, New York: Alfred A. Knopf, 2001.
 Artyukhin Yu. B. Commander Islands, Petropavlovsk-Kamchatsky, 2005.

External links 
 Unofficial website of the Commander Islands
 Photos of the Commander Islands
Overview of the Kommandorsky Zapovednik
Details of their current situation
Commander Islands at the Natural Heritage Protection Fund.
Island in a Storm
RI0Z Amateur Radio Expedition to Commander Islands

 
Islands of the Aleutian Islands
Archipelagoes of the Pacific Ocean
Archipelagoes of Kamchatka Krai
Islands of the Bering Sea
 
Islands of the Russian Far East
Pacific Coast of Russia
World Heritage Tentative List
Important Bird Areas of Russia
Important Bird Areas of the Aleutian Islands